Leo, Léon, or Lev Lerch (13 August 1856 – 6 May 1892) was a Czech painter.

Life 
Leo Lerch was born in Smíchov, near Prague, on 13 August 1856. He studied at the Munich Academy and was a pupil of Ludwig von Löfftz. He became known as a history painter. He won a bronze medal in Paris at the 1889 Exposition Universelle. He died in Smíchov on 6 May 1892.

Holdings 

 Munich (Neue Pinakothek): Pietà
 Prague (Galerie Rudolfinum): Bust of an Old Man

Gallery

References

Sources 

 Beyer, Andreas; Savoy, Bénédicte; Tegethoff, Wolf, eds. (2021). "Lerch, Leo". In Allgemeines Künstlerlexikon - Internationale Künstlerdatenbank - Online. K. G. Saur. Retrieved 8 October 2022.
 Weitenweber, Vilém (13 May 1892). "Lev Lerch". Zlatá Praha, 9(26): pp. 311–312. (in Czech).
 "Lerch, Leo or Léon". Benezit Dictionary of Artists. 2011. Oxford Art Online. Retrieved 8 October 2022.

1856 births
1892 deaths
19th-century Czech painters